The Jordan River is a river in the Middle East draining into the Dead Sea.

Jordan River or River Jordan or River of Jordan may also refer to:

Rivers

Australia
Jordan River (Tasmania)
Jordan River (Victoria)

Canada
Jordan River, British Columbia, or River Jordan, a settlement on Vancouver Island
Jordan River system of the Tobeatic Game Reserve, Nova Scotia

New Zealand
Jordan River (New Zealand), the name of two rivers

United Kingdom
 River Jordan, a tributary of the River Valency in Cornwall
River Jordan, Dorset
River Jordan, Liverpool
River Jordan, Northamptonshire

United States
River Jordan, the original name of the East Bay River, Navarre, Florida
Jordan River, a section of Clear Creek (Salt Creek), Indiana
Jordan River (Maine)
Jordan River (Beaver Island), Michigan
Jordan River (Michigan)
River Jordan, a name given to the Ohio River by escaping slaves 
Jordan River (Utah)
Jordan River (Virginia)

Songs

"River Jordan", by Clancy Eccles, 1960
"River Jordan", by Sugar Minott from Black Roots, 1979
"River Jordan", by Vusi Mahlasela from Guiding Star (2007 album)
"River Jordan", from The Civil War (musical)
"River Jordan", by Janis Joplin, from Janis (1975 album)
"River Jordan", by The Felice Brothers from Celebration, Florida (album), 2011
"River Jordan", by Prince Far I from Livity, 1981 
"River of Jordan", by Lecrae from the soundtrack of The Shack (2017 film)
"River of Jordan", by Reno and Smiley, 1967
"River of Jordan", from Sunshine (Jeff & Sheri Easter album), 2004
"River of Jordan", a single by Carter Family
"River of Jordan", from Satan Is Real by The Louvin Brothers, 1959

See also
Jordan (disambiguation)
Jordan Creek (disambiguation)
Jordão River (disambiguation)